Cornelius Castoriadis (11 March 1922 – 26 December 1997) was a Greek-French philosopher, social critic, economist, psychoanalyst, author of The Imaginary Institution of Society, and co-founder of the Socialisme ou Barbarie group.

His writings on autonomy and social institutions have been influential in both academic and activist circles.

Biography

Early life in Athens 
Cornelius Castoriadis (named after Saint Cornelius the Centurion) was born on 11 March 1922 in Constantinople, the son of Kaisar ("Caesar") and Sophia Kastoriadis. His family had to move in July 1922 to Athens due to the Greek–Turkish population exchange. He developed an interest in politics after he came into contact with Marxist thought and philosophy at the age of 13. At the same time he began studying traditional philosophy after purchasing a copy of the book History of Philosophy (Ιστορία της Φιλοσοφίας, 1933, 2 vols.) by the historian of ideas .

Sometime between 1932 and 1935, Maximiani Portas (later known as "Savitri Devi") was the French tutor of Castoriadis. During the same period, he attended the 8th Gymnasium of Athens in Kato Patisia, from which he graduated in 1937.

His first active involvement in politics occurred during the Metaxas Regime (1937), when he joined the Athenian Communist Youth (Κομμουνιστική Νεολαία Αθήνας, Kommounistiki Neolaia Athinas), a section of the Young Communist League of Greece. In 1941 he joined the Communist Party of Greece (KKE), only to leave one year later in order to become an active Trotskyist. The latter action resulted in his persecution by both the Germans and the Communist Party.

In 1944 he wrote his first essays on social science and Max Weber, which he published in a magazine named Archive of Sociology and Ethics (Αρχείον Κοινωνιολογίας και Ηθικής, Archeion Koinoniologias kai Ithikis). Castoriadis heavily criticized the actions of the KKE during the December 1944 clashes between the communist-led ELAS on one side, and the Papandreou government aided by British troops on the other.

In December 1945, three years after earning a bachelor's degree in law, economics and political science from the School of Law, Economics and Political Sciences of the University of Athens (where he met and collaborated with the Neo-Kantian intellectuals Konstantinos Despotopoulos, Panagiotis Kanellopoulos, Konstantinos Tsatsos), he got aboard the RMS Mataroa, a New Zealand ocean liner, to go to Paris (where he remained permanently) to continue his studies under a scholarship offered by the French Institute of Athens. The same voyage—organized by Octave Merlier—also brought from Greece to France a number of other Greek writers, artists and intellectuals, including Constantine Andreou, Kostas Axelos, Georges Candilis, Costa Coulentianos, Emmanuel Kriaras, Adonis A. Kyrou, Kostas Papaïoannou, and Virgile Solomonidis.

Paris and the Chaulieu–Montal Tendency 
Once in Paris, Castoriadis joined the Trotskyist Parti Communiste Internationaliste (PCI). He and Claude Lefort constituted a Chaulieu–Montal Tendency in the French PCI in 1946. In 1948, they experienced their "final disenchantment with Trotskyism", leading them to break away to found the libertarian socialist and councilist group and journal Socialisme ou Barbarie (S. ou B., 1949–1966), which included Jean-François Lyotard and Guy Debord as members for a while, and profoundly influenced the French intellectual left. Castoriadis had links with the group known as the Johnson–Forest Tendency until 1958. Also strongly influenced by Castoriadis and Socialisme ou Barbarie were the British group and journal Solidarity and Maurice Brinton.

Early philosophical research 
In the late 1940s, he started attending philosophical and sociological courses at the Faculty of Letters at the University of Paris (faculté des lettres de Paris), where among his teachers were Gaston Bachelard, the epistemologist René Poirier, the historian of philosophy Henri Bréhier (not to be confused with Émile Bréhier), Henri Gouhier, Jean Wahl, Gustave Guillaume, Albert Bayet, and Georges Davy. He submitted a proposal for a doctoral dissertation on mathematical logic to Poirier, but he eventually abandoned the project. The working title of his thesis was Introduction à la logique axiomatique (Introduction to Axiomatic logic).

Career as economist and distancing from Marxism 
At the same time (starting in November 1948), he worked as an economist at the Organisation for Economic Co-operation and Development (OECD) until 1970, which was also the year when he obtained French citizenship. Consequently, his writings prior to that date were published pseudonymously, as "Pierre Chaulieu," "Paul Cardan," "Jean-Marc Coudray" etc.

In his 1949 essay "The Relations of Production in Russia", Castoriadis developed a critique of the supposed socialist character of the government of the Soviet Union. According to Castoriadis, the central claim of the Stalinist regime at the time was that the mode of production in Russia was socialist, but the mode of distribution was not yet a socialist one since the socialist edification in the country had not yet been completed. However, according to Castoriadis' analysis, since the mode of distribution of the social product is inseparable from the mode of production, the claim that one can have control over distribution while not having control over production is meaningless.

Castoriadis was particularly influential in the turn of the intellectual left during the 1950s against the Soviet Union, because he argued that the Soviet Union was not a communist but rather a bureaucratic capitalist state, which contrasted with Western powers mostly by virtue of its centralized power apparatus. His work in the OECD substantially helped his analyses.

In the latter years of Socialisme ou Barbarie, Castoriadis came to reject the Marxist theories of economics and of history, especially in an essay on "Modern Capitalism and Revolution", first published in Socialisme ou Barbarie in 1960–61 (first English translation in 1963 by Solidarity). Castoriadis' final Socialisme ou Barbarie essay was "Marxism and Revolutionary Theory", published in April 1964 – June 1965. There he concluded that a revolutionary Marxist must choose either to remain Marxist or to remain revolutionary.

Psychoanalyst 
When Jacques Lacan's disputes with the International Psychoanalytical Association led to a split and the formation of the École Freudienne de Paris (EFP) in 1964, Castoriadis became a member (as a non-practitioner).

In 1968 Castoriadis married Piera Aulagnier, a French psychoanalyst who had undergone psychoanalytic treatment under Jacques Lacan from 1955 until 1961.

In 1969 Castoriadis and Aulagnier split from the EFP to join the Organisation psychanalytique de langue française (OPLF), the so-called "Quatrième Groupe", a psychoanalytic group that claims to follow principles and methods that have opened up a third way between Lacanianism and the standards of the International Psychoanalytical Association.

Castoriadis began to practice analysis in 1973 (he had undergone analysis in the 1960s first with Irène Roubleff and then later with Michel Renard).

Philosopher of history and ontologist 
In 1967, Castoriadis submitted a proposal for a doctoral dissertation on the philosophy of history to Paul Ricœur (then at the University of Nanterre). An epistolary dialogue began between them but Ricœur's obligations to the University of Chicago in the 1970s were such that their collaboration was not feasible at the time. The subject of his thesis would be Le fondement imaginaire du social-historique (The Imaginary Foundations of the Social-Historical) (see below).

In his 1975 work, L'Institution imaginaire de la société (Imaginary Institution of Society), and in Les carrefours du labyrinthe (Crossroads in the Labyrinth), published in 1978, Castoriadis began to develop his distinctive understanding of historical change as the emergence of irrecoverable otherness that must always be socially instituted and named in order to be recognized. Otherness emerges in part from the activity of the psyche itself. Creating external social institutions that give stable form to what Castoriadis terms the (ontological) "magma of social significations" allows the psyche to create stable figures for the self, and to ignore the constant emergence of mental indeterminacy and alterity.

For Castoriadis, self-examination, as in the ancient Greek tradition, could draw upon the resources of modern psychoanalysis. Autonomous individuals—the essence of an autonomous society—must continuously examine themselves and engage in critical reflection. He writes:
... psychoanalysis can and should make a basic contribution to a politics of autonomy. For, each person's self-understanding is a necessary condition for autonomy. One cannot have an autonomous society that would fail to turn back upon itself, that would not interrogate itself about its motives, its reasons for acting, its deep-seated [profondes] tendencies. Considered in concrete terms, however, society doesn't exist outside the individuals making it up. The self-reflective activity of an autonomous society depends essentially upon the self-reflective activity of the humans who form that society.

Castoriadis was not calling for every individual to undergo psychoanalysis, per se. Rather, by reforming education and political systems, individuals would be increasingly capable of critical self- and social reflexion. He offers: "if psychoanalytic practice has a political meaning, it is solely to the extent that it tries, as far as it possibly can, to render the individual autonomous, that is to say, lucid concerning her desire and concerning reality, and responsible for her acts: holding herself accountable for what she does."

Sovietologist 
In his 1980 Facing the War text, he took the view that Russia had become the primary world military power. To sustain this, in the context of the visible economic inferiority of the Soviet Union in the civilian sector, he proposed that the society may no longer be dominated by the one-party state bureaucracy but by a "stratocracy"—a separate and dominant military sector with expansionist designs on the world. He further argued that this meant there was no internal class dynamic which could lead to social revolution within Russian society and that change could only occur through foreign intervention.

Later life 
In 1980, he joined the faculty of the École des Hautes Études en Sciences Sociales (EHESS) as Directeur d'études (Director of Studies). He had been elected Directeur de recherche (Director of Research) in EHESS at the end of 1979 after submitting his previously published material in conjunction with a defense of his intellectual project of connecting the disciplines of history, sociology and economy through the concept of the social imaginary (see below). His teaching career at the EHESS lasted sixteen years.

In 1980, he was also awarded his State doctorate from the University of Nanterre; the final title of his thesis under Ricœur (see above) was L'Élément imaginaire de l'histoire (The Imaginary Element in History).

In 1984, Castoriadis and Aulagnier divorced.

In 1989, he was awarded an Honorary Doctorate in Social Sciences by Panteion University and in 1993 another one in Education Sciences by the Democritus University of Thrace.

In 1992, he joined the libertarian socialist journal Society and Nature (established by Takis Fotopoulos) as a writer; the magazine also featured such writers as Murray Bookchin and Noam Chomsky.

He died on 26 December 1997 from complications following heart surgery. He was survived by Zoe Christofidi (his wife at the time of his death), his daughter Sparta (by an earlier relationship with Jeanine "Rilka" Walter, "Comrade Victorine" in the Fourth International), and Kyveli, a younger daughter from his marriage with Zoe.

Philosophy 
Edgar Morin proposed that Castoriadis' work will be remembered for its remarkable continuity and coherence as well as for its extraordinary breadth which was "encyclopaedic" in the original Greek sense, for it offered us a paideia, or education, that brought full circle our cycle of otherwise compartmentalized knowledge in the arts and sciences. Castoriadis wrote essays on mathematics, physics, biology, anthropology, psychoanalysis, linguistics, society, economics, politics, philosophy, and art.

One of Castoriadis' many important contributions to social theory was the idea that social change involves radical discontinuities that cannot be understood in terms of any determinate causes or presented as a sequence of events. Change emerges through the social imaginary without strict determinations, but in order to be socially recognized it must be instituted as revolution. Any knowledge of society and social change can exist only by referring to (or by positing) social imaginary significations. Thus, Castoriadis developed a conceptual framework where the sociological and philosophical category of the social imaginary has a central place and he offered an interpretation of modernity centered on the principal categories of social institutions and social imaginary significations; in his analysis, these categories are the product of the human faculties of the radical imagination and the social imaginary, the latter faculty being the collective dimension of the former. (According to Castoriadis, the sociological and philosophical category of the radical imaginary can be manifested only through the individual radical imagination and the social imaginary.) However, the social imaginary cannot be reduced or attributed to subjective imagination, since the individual is informed through an internalisation of social significations.

He used traditional terms as much as possible, though consistently redefining them. Further, some of his terminology changed throughout the later part of his career, with the terms gaining greater consistency but breaking from their traditional meaning (thus creating neologisms). When reading Castoriadis, it is helpful to understand what he means by the terms he uses, since he does not redefine the terms in every piece where he employs them.

Autonomy and heteronomy 

The concept of autonomy was central to his early writings, and he continued to elaborate on its meaning, applications, and limits until his death, gaining him the title of "Philosopher of Autonomy." The word itself is Greek, where auto means "for/by itself" and nomos means "law." It refers to the condition of "self-institution" by which one creates their own laws, whether as an individual or as a whole society. And while every society creates their own institutions, only the members of autonomous societies are fully aware of the fact, and consider themselves to be the ultimate source of justice. In contrast, members of heteronomous societies (hetero- 'other') delegate this process to an authority outside of society, often attributing the source of their traditions to divine origins or, in modern times, to "historical necessity." Castoriadis then identified the need of societies not only to create but to legitimize their laws, to explain, in other words, why their laws are just. Most traditional societies did that through religion, claiming their laws were given by God or a mythical ancestor and therefore must be true.

An exception to this rule is to be found in Ancient Greece, where the constellation of cities (poleis) that spread throughout the eastern Mediterranean, although not all democratic, showed strong signs of autonomy, and during its peak, Athens became fully aware of the fact as seen in Pericles' Funeral Oration. Castoriadis considered Greece, a topic that increasingly drew his attention, not as a blueprint to be copied but an experiment that could inspire a truly autonomous community, one that could legitimize its laws without assigning their source to a higher authority. The Greeks differed from other societies because they not only started as autonomous but maintained this ideal by challenging their laws on a constant basis while obeying them to the same degree (even to the extent of enforcing capital punishment), proving that autonomous societies can indeed exist.

Regarding modern societies, Castoriadis notes that while religions have lost part of their normative function, their nature is still heteronomous, only that this time it has rational pretenses. Capitalism legitimizes itself through "reason," claiming that it makes "rational sense", but Castoriadis observed that all such efforts are ultimately tautological, in that they can only legitimize a system through the rules defined by the system itself. So just like the Old Testament claimed that "There is only one God, God," capitalism defines logic as the maximization of utility and minimization of costs, and then legitimizes itself based on its effectiveness to meet these criteria. Surprisingly, this definition of logic is also shared by Communism, which despite the fact it stands in seeming opposition, it is the product of the same imaginary, and uses the same concepts and categories to describe the world, principally in material terms and through the process of human labor.

The imaginary 
In the context of being a specific term in psychoanalysis, "imaginary" originates in the writings of the French psychoanalyst Jacques Lacan (see the Imaginary) and is strongly associated with Castoriadis' work. Castoriadis believed that for a given society, as we penetrate the layers of its culture deeper and deeper, we arrive at meanings that do not mean something other than themselves. They are, so to speak, "final meanings" that the society in question has imposed on the world, on itself. Because these meanings (manifestations of the "radical imaginary" in Castoriadian terminology) do not point to anything concrete, and because the logical categories needed to analyze them are derived from them, these meanings cannot be analysed rationally. They are arational (rather than irrational), and must therefore be acknowledged rather than comprehended in the common use of the term. Castoriadis' views on concept formation is in sharp contrast to that of postmodernists like Jacques Derrida, who explicitly denies the existence of concepts "in and of themselves".

Radical imaginary is at the basis of cultures and accounts for their differences. In his seminal work The Imaginary Institution of Society, Castoriadis argues that societies are founded not as products of historical necessity, but as the result of a new and radical idea of the world, an idea that appears to spring fully formed and is practically irreducible. All cultural forms (laws and institutions, aesthetics and ritual) follow from this radical imaginary, and are not to be explained merely as products of material conditions. Castoriadis then is offering an "ontogenetic", or "emergentist" model of history, one that is apparently unpopular amongst modern historians, but can serve as a valuable critique of historical materialism. For example, Castoriadis believed that Ancient Greeks had an imaginary by which the world stems from Chaos, while in contrast, the Hebrews had an imaginary by which the world stems from the will of a rational entity, God or Yahweh in the Hebrew Bible. The former developed therefore a system of direct democracy where the laws were ever changing according to the people's will while the second a theocratic system according to which man is in an eternal quest to understand and enforce the will of God.

Traditional societies had elaborate imaginaries, expressed through various creation myths, by which they explained how the world came to be and how it is sustained. Capitalism did away with this mythic imaginary by replacing it with what it claims to be pure reason (as examined above). That same imaginary is the foundation of its opposing ideology, Communism. By that measure he observes (first in his main criticism of Marxism, titled the Imaginary Institution of Society, and subsequently in a speech he gave at the Université catholique de Louvain on February 27, 1980) that these two systems are more closely related than was previously thought, since they share the same industrial revolution type imaginary: that of a rational society where man's welfare is materially measurable and infinitely improvable through the expansion of industries and advancements in science. In this respect Marx failed to understand that technology is not, as he claimed, the main drive of social change, since we have historical examples where societies possessing near identical technologies formed very different relations to them. An example given in the book is France and England during the industrial revolution with the second being much more liberal than the first. Similarly, in the issue of ecology he observes that the problems facing our environment are only present within the capitalist imaginary that values the continuous expansion of industries. Trying to solve it by changing or managing these industries better might fail, since it essentially acknowledges this imaginary as real, thus perpetuating the problem.

Castoriadis also believed that the complex historical processes through which new imaginaries are born are not directly quantifiable by science. This is because it is through the imaginaries themselves that the categories upon which science is applied are created. In the second part of his Imaginary Institution of Society (titled "The Social Imaginary and the Institution"), he gives the example of set theory, which is at the basis of formal logic, which cannot function without having first defined the "elements" which are to be assigned to sets. This initial schema of separation (schéma de séparation, σχήμα του χωρισμού) of the world into distinct elements and categories therefore, precedes the application of (formal) logic and, consequently, science.

Social constructionism 
Castoriadis was a social constructionist and a moral relativist insofar as he held that the radical imaginary of each society was opaque to rational analysis. Since he believed that social norms and morals ultimately derive from a society's unique idea of the world, which emerges fully formed at a given moment in history and cannot be reduced further. From this he concluded that any criteria by which one could evaluate these morals objectively are also derived from the said imaginary, rendering this evaluation subjective. This does not mean that Castoriadis stopped believing in the value of social struggles for a better world, he simply thought that rationally proving their value is impossible.

This however does not mean that Castoriadis believed there is no truth, but that truth is linked to the imaginary which is ultimately arational. In his book World in Fragments, which includes essays on science, he explicitly writes that "We have to understand that there is truth - and that it is to be made/to be done, that to attain [atteindre] it we have to create it, which means, first and foremost, to imagine it". He then quotes Blake who said "What is now proved was once only imagin'd".

Chaos 
The concept of Chaos, as found in Ancient Greek cosmogony, plays a significant role in Castoriadis' work, and is connected to the idea of the "imaginary". Castoriadis translates the Greek word "chaos" as nothingness. According to him, the core of the Greek imaginary was a world that came from Chaos rather than the will of God as described in Genesis. Castoriadis concludes that the Greeks' imaginary of a "world out of chaos" was what allowed them to create institutions such as democracy, because— if the world is created out of nothing— man can model it as he sees fit, without trying to conform to some divine law. He contrasted the Greek imaginary to the Biblical imaginary in which God is a "willing" (i.e. intentional) agent and man's position is to understand God's will and act according to it.

The Ancient Greeks and the modern West 

Castoriadis views the political organization of the ancient Greek cities (poleis) not as a model to imitate, rather as a source of inspiration towards an autonomous society. He rejects also the term city state used to describe Ancient Greek cities; for him the administration of Greek poleis was not that of a State in the modern sense of the term, since Greek poleis were self–administrated. The same goes for colonisation since the neighbouring Phoenicians, who had a similar expansion in the Mediterranean, were monarchical till their end. During this time of colonization, however, around the time of Homer's epic poems, we observe for the first time that the Greeks, instead of transferring their mother city's social system to the newly established colony, instead, for the first time in known history, legislate anew from the ground up. What also made the Greeks special was the fact that, following the above, they kept this system as a perpetual autonomy which led to direct democracy.

This phenomenon of autonomy is again present in the emergence of the states of northern Italy during the Renaissance, again as a product of small independent merchants.

He sees a tension in the modern West between, on the one hand, the potentials for autonomy and creativity and the proliferation of "open societies" and, on the other hand, the spirit-crushing force of capitalism. These are respectively characterized as the creative imaginary and the capitalist imaginary:
I think that we are at a crossing in the roads of history, history in the grand sense. One road already appears clearly laid out, at least in its general orientation. That's the road of the loss of meaning, of the repetition of empty forms, of conformism, apathy, irresponsibility, and cynicism at the same time as it is that of the tightening grip of the capitalist imaginary of unlimited expansion of "rational mastery," pseudorational pseudomastery, of an unlimited expansion of consumption for the sake of consumption, that is to say, for nothing, and of a technoscience that has become autonomized along its path and that is evidently involved in the domination of this capitalist imaginary.
The other road should be opened: it is not at all laid out. It can be opened only through a social and political awakening, a resurgence of the project of individual and collective autonomy, that is to say, of the will to freedom. This would require an awakening of the imagination and of the creative imaginary.

He argues that, in the last two centuries, ideas about autonomy again come to the fore: "This extraordinary profusion reaches a sort of pinnacle during the two centuries stretching between 1750 and 1950. This is a very specific period because of the very great density of cultural creation but also because of its very strong
subversiveness."

Lasting influence 
Castoriadis has influenced European (especially continental) thought in important ways. His interventions in sociological and political theory have resulted in some of the most well-known writing to emerge from the continent (especially in the figure of Jürgen Habermas, who often can be seen to be writing against Castoriadis). Hans Joas published a number of articles in American journals in order to highlight the importance of Castoriadis' work to a North American sociological audience, and Johann Pál Arnason has been of enduring importance both for his critical engagement with Castoriadis' thought and for his sustained efforts to introduce it to the English speaking public (especially during his editorship of the journal Thesis Eleven). In the last few years, there has been growing interest in Castoriadis's thought, including the publication of two monographs authored by Arnason's former students: Jeff Klooger's Castoriadis: Psyche, Society, Autonomy (Brill), and Suzi Adams's Castoriadis's Ontology: Being and Creation (Fordham University Press).

Major publications 
Original French
 Mai 68 : la brèche [The Breach], Fayard, 1968 (under the pseudonym Jean-Marc Coudray; co-authored with Edgar Morin and Claude Lefort)
 La Société bureaucratique [Bureaucratic Society] in two volumes: Les Rapports de production en Russie and La Révolution contre la bureaucratie, 1973
 L'Expérience du mouvement ouvrier [The Experience of the Labor Movement] in two volumes: Comment lutter and Prolétariat et organisation, 1974
 L'Institution imaginaire de la société [The Imaginary Institution of Society], Seuil, 1975
 Les Carrefours du labyrinthe [Crossroads in the Labyrinth], Volume I, 1978 
 Le Contenu du socialisme [On the Content of Socialism], 1979—originally published in three parts in S. ou B. (July 1955; translated in PSW 1, pp. 290–307), S. ou B. (July 1957; translated in PSW 2, pp. 90–154), and S. ou B. (January 1958; translated in PSW 2, pp. 155–192)
 Capitalisme moderne et révolution [Modern Capitalism and Revolution] in two volumes, 1979
 De l'écologie à l'autonomie [EA] [From Ecology to Autonomy] (avec Daniel Cohn-Bendit et le Public de Louvain-la-Neuve), 1981
 Devant la guerre [Facing the War], Volume I, 1981 (a second volume was never published)
 Domaines de l'homme [Domains of Man] (Les carrefours du labyrinthe II), 1986
 La Brèche: vingt ans après (réédition du livre de 1968 complété par de nouveaux textes) [The Breach: Twenty Years After], 1988
 Le Monde morcelé [World in Fragments] (Les carrefours du labyrinthe III), 1990
 La Montée de l'insignifiance [The Rising Tide of Insignificancy] (Les carrefours du labyrinthe IV), 1996
 Fait et à faire [Done and To Be Done] (Les carrefours du labyrinthe V), 1997

Posthumous publications
 Η Αρχαία Ελληνική Δημοκρατία και η Σημασία της για μας Σήμερα [Ancient Greek Democracy and Its Importance for Us Today], Athens: Ypsilon, 1999 (based on a lecture delivered in Leonidio on 17 August 1984)
 Figures du pensable [Figures of the Thinkable] (Les carrefours du labyrinthe VI), 1999
 Sur Le Politique de Platon [Commentary on The Statesman of Plato], 1999
 Sujet et vérité dans le monde social-historique. La création humaine 1 [Subject and Truth in the Social-Historical World. Human Creation 1], 2002
 Ce qui fait la Grèce, 1. D'Homère à Héraclite. La création humaine 2 [What Makes Greece, 1. From Homer to Heraclitus. Human Creation 2], 2004
 Φιλοσοφία και επιστήμη. Ένας διάλογος με τον Γεώργιο Λ. Ευαγγελόπουλο [Philosophy and Science. A Discussion with Yorgos L. Evangelopoulos], Athens: Eurasia books, 2004, 
 Une Société à la dérive, entretiens et débats 1974–1997 [A Society Adrift], 2005
 Post-scriptum sur l'insignifiance : entretiens avec Daniel Mermet; suivi de dialogue [Postscript on Insignificance], 2007
 Fenêtre sur le chaos [Window on the Chaos] (compiled by Enrique Escobar, Myrto Gondicas, and Pascal Vernay), Seuil, 2007,  (Castoriadis' writings on modern art and aesthetics)
 Ce qui fait la Grèce, 2. La cité et les lois. La création humaine 3 [What Makes Greece, 2. The City and Laws. Human Creation 3], 2008
 L'Imaginaire comme tel [The Imaginary As Such], 2008
 Histoire et création : Textes philosophiques inédits, 1945–1967 [History and Creation: Unedited Philosophical Texts 1945–1967], 2009
 Ce qui fait la Grèce, 3. Thucydide, la force et le droit. La création humaine 4 [What Makes Greece, 3. Thucydides, Force and Right. Human Creation 4], 2011
 La Culture de l'égoïsme [The Culture of Egoism] (transcription of an interview that Castoriadis and Christopher Lasch gave to Michael Ignatieff in 1986; translated into French by Myrto Gondicas), Climats, 2012,  (interview about the topic of the retreat of individuals from public space into private matters)
 Écrits politiques 1945–1997 [Political Writings 1945–1997] (compiled by Myrto Gondicas, Enrique Escobar and Pascal Vernay), Éditions du Sandre:
 La Question du mouvement ouvrier [The Question of Workers' Movement] (vols. 1 and 2), 2012
 Quelle démocratie ? [What Democracy?] (vols. 3 and 4), 2013
 La Société bureaucratique [The Bureaucratic Society] (vol. 5), 2015
 Devant la guerre et autres écrits [Facing the War and Other Writings] (vol. 6), TBA
 Sur la dynamique du capitalisme et autres textes, suivi de l'impérialisme et la guerre [On the Dynamics of Capitalism and Other Texts Followed by Imperialism and War] (vol. 7), TBA
 Dialogue sur l'histoire et l'imaginaire social [Dialogue on History and the Social Imaginary], 2016 (transcription of an interview that Castoriadis gave to Paul Ricœur)

Selected translations of works by Castoriadis
The Imaginary Institution of Society [IIS] (trans. Kathleen Blamey). MIT Press, Cambridge 1997 [1987]. 432 pp. . (pb.)
Crossroads in the Labyrinth, Six-Volume Series. Translated from the French and edited anonymously as a public service. Electronic publication date: March 2022
Vol. 1. Crossroads in the Labyrinth
Vol. 2: Human Domains
Vol. 3: World in Fragments
Vol. 4: The Rising Tide of Insignificancy
Vol. 5: Done and To Be Done
Vol. 6: Figures of the Thinkable
The Castoriadis Reader [CR] (ed./trans. David Ames Curtis). Blackwell Publisher, Oxford 1997. 470 pp. . (pb.)
World in Fragments: Writings on Politics, Society, Psychoanalysis, and the Imagination [WIF] (ed./trans. David Ames Curtis). Stanford University Press, Stanford, CA 1997. 507 pp. .
Political and Social Writings [PSW 1]. Volume 1: 1946–1955. From the Critique of Bureaucracy to the Positive Content of Socialism (ed./trans. David Ames Curtis). University of Minnesota Press, Minneapolis 1988. 348 pp. .
Political and Social Writings [PSW 2]. Volume 2: 1955–1960. From the Workers' Struggle Against Bureaucracy to Revolution in the Age of Modern Capitalism (ed./trans. David Ames Curtis). University of Minnesota Press, Minneapolis 1988. 363 pp. .
Political and Social Writings [PSW 3]. Volume 3: 1961–1979. Recommencing the Revolution: From Socialism to the Autonomous Society (ed./trans. David Ames Curtis). University of Minnesota Press, Minneapolis 1992. 405 pp. .
Modern Capitalism and Revolution [MCR] (trans. Maurice Brinton), London: Solidarity, 1965 (including an introduction and additional English material by Brinton; the second English edition was published by Solidarity in 1974, with a new introduction by Castoriadis)
Philosophy, Politics, Autonomy. Essays in Political Philosophy [PPA] (ed. David Ames Curtis). Oxford University Press, New York/Oxford 1991. 306 pp. .
Crossroads in the Labyrinth [CL] (trans. M. H. Ryle/K. Soper). MIT Press, Cambridge, MA 1984. 345 pp.
On Plato's Statesman [OPS] (trans. David Ames Curtis). Stanford University Press, Stanford, CA 2002. 227 pp.
"The Crisis of Western Societies." Telos 53 (Fall 1982). New York: Telos Press.
Figures of the Thinkable [FT B] (trans. Helen Arnold). Stanford University Press, Stanford, CA 2007. 304 pp. (Also trans. anon. February 2005 [FT A].)
A Society Adrift. Interviews and Debates, 1974–1997 [SA] (trans. Helen Arnold). Fordham University Press, New York 2010. 259 pp. (Also trans. anon. October 2010: A Society Adrift: More Interviews and Discussions on The Rising Tide of Insignificancy, Including Revolutionary Perspectives Today. Translated from the French and edited anonymously as a public service.)
"The Dilapidation of the West: An Interview with Cornelius Castoriadis" (trans. David Ames Curtis), Thesis Eleven, May 1995, 41(1): 94–114.
"Psychoanalysis and Politics", in: Sonu Shamdasani and Michael Münchow (eds.), Speculations After Freud: Psychoanalysis, Philosophy, and Culture, Routledge, 1994, pp. 1–12 (also in: World in Fragments, 1997, pp. 125–136)
Postscript on Insignificance: Dialogues with Cornelius Castoriadis [PI B] (ed./trans. Gabriel Rockhill and John V. Garner). Continuum, London  2011. 160 pp. . (hb.) (Also trans. anon. March 2011: Postscript on Insignificancy, including More Interviews and Discussions on the Rising Tide of Insignificancy, followed by Six Dialogues, Four Portraits and Two Book Reviews [PI A]. Translated from the French and edited anonymously as a public service.)
The Rising Tide of Insignificancy (The Big Sleep) [RTI]. Translated from the French and edited anonymously as a public service. Electronic publication date: December 2003.
Democracy and Relativism: A Debate [DR]. Translated from the French by John V. Garner. Rowman & Littlefield, 2019. . (Also, trans. anon. January 2013.)
Window on the Chaos, Including "How I Didn't Become a Musician" – Beta Version [WC]. Translated from the French and edited anonymously as a public service. Electronic publication date: July 2015.

See also 

 Autopoiesis, a term inspired by Castoriadis' philosophy
 The French autonome movement
 Verstehen, Castoriadis' adopted methodology of studying social meaning
 Workers' council

Notes

References

Sources 
François Dosse. Castoriadis. Une vie. Paris: La Découverte, 2014. .
Anthony Elliott. Critical Visions: New Directions in Social Theory. Rowman & Littlefield, 2003. .
Christos Memos. Castoriadis and Critical Theory: Crisis, Critique and Radical Alternatives. Palgrave Macmillan, 2014. .
Alan D. Schrift. Twentieth-Century French Philosophy: Key Themes and Thinkers. John Wiley & Sons, 2006. . 
Theofanis Tasis. Καστοριάδης. Μια φιλοσοφία της αυτονομίας [Castoriadis. A philosophy of autonomy]. Athens: Eurasia books. December 2007. .
Theofanis Tassis. Cornelius Castoriadis. Disposition einer Philosophie. 2007. FU Dissertationen Online.
Alexandros Schismenos. Η Ανθρώπινη Τρικυμία. Ψυχή και Αυτονομία στη Φιλοσοφία του Κορνήλιου Καστοριάδη [The Human Tempest. Psyche and Αutonomy in the Philosophy of Cornelius Castoriadis]. Athens: Exarcheia, 2013. .

Further reading 

Nelly Andrikopoulou. Το ταξίδι του Ματαρόα, 1945 [Mataroa's Voyage, 1945]. Athens: "Hestia" Printing House, 2007. .
Giorgio Baruchello and Ingerid S. Straume (eds.). Creation, Rationality and Autonomy: Essays on Cornelius Castoriadis. Aarhus Universitetsforlag. 2013. .
Maurice Brinton. For Workers' Power. Selected Writings (ed. David Goodway). Edinburgh/Oakland: AK Press, 2004. .
David Ames Curtis, "Socialism or Barbarism: The Alternative Presented in the Work of Cornelius Castoriadis." Revue Européenne des Sciences Sociales, 86 (December 1989): 293–322. <https://www.academia.edu/13495706/Socialism_or_Barbarism_The_Alternative_Presented_in_the_Work_of_Cornelius_Castoriadis>.
Dimitris Eleas. Ιδιωτικός Κορνήλιος: Προσωπική Μαρτυρία για τον Καστοριάδη [Private Cornelius: Personal Testimony about Castoriadis]. Athens: Angelakis, July 2014. .
Andrea Gabler. Antizipierte Autonomie. Zur Theorie und Praxis der Gruppe "Socialisme ou Barbarie" (1949–1967). Hanover: Offizin Verlag, 2009. .
Jürgen Habermas. The Philosophical Discourse of Modernity: "Excursus on Castoriadis: The Imaginary Institution." Polity Press, 1990, pp. 327–35. .
Axel Honneth. "Rescuing the Revolution with an Ontology: On Cornelius Castoriadis' Theory of Society". In: The Fragmanted World of the Social. Essays in Social and Political Philosophy (ed. Charles Wright), SUNY Press, 1995, pp. 168–183. .
Hans Joas. Pragmatism and Social Theory. University of Chicago Press, 1993, pp. 154–171. 
Vrasidas Karalis (ed.). Cornelius Castoriadis and Radical Democracy. Brill, 2009. .
Alexandros Kioupkiolis. Freedom After the Critique of Foundations: Marx, Liberalism, Castoriadis and Agonistic Autonomy. Palgrave Macmillan, 2012. .
Jeff Klooger. Castoriadis: Psyche, Society, Autonomy. Brill, 2009. .
Yannis Ktenas and Alexandros Schismenos.(eds.) Η Σκέψη του Κορνήλιου Καστοριάδη και η Σημασία της για μας Σήμερα [The Thought of Cornelius Castoriadis and its Significance for Us Today]. Athens: Eurasia books. 2018. .
Serge Latouche. Cornelius Castoriadis ou l'autonomie radicale. Le Passager Clandestin, 2014. .
Yannis Lazaratos, Το παράθυρο του Καστοριάδη. Χάος, Άβυσσος, Απύθμενο. [The Window of Castoriadis. Chaos, Abyss, Grounless]. Athens: Papazisis, 2018. .          
Johann Michel. Ricoeur and the Post-Structuralists: Bourdieu, Derrida, Deleuze, Foucault, Castoriadis. Rowman & Littlefield International, 2014. .
Mathieu Noury. Cornelius Castoriadis, sociologue ? Critique sociologique de l'ontologie de la création imaginaire sociale. Revue Aspects Sociologiques, 18(1), March 2011.
Yorgos Oikonomou (ed.), Η Γένεση της Δημοκρατίας και η Σημερινή Κρίση [The Birth of Democracy and Contemporary Crisis]. Athens: Eurasia books. 2011. .
Mathieu Potte-Bonneville, "Risked democracy: Foucault, Castoriadis and the Greeks". Radical Philosophy 166 (March/April 2011).
Jean-Louis Prat. Introduction à Castoriadis. Paris: La Découverte. 2007. .
Richard Rorty. "Unger, Castoriadis, and the Romance of a National Future." Northwestern University Law Review, 82(2):335–51 (1988).
Alexandros Schismenos and Nikos Ioannou. Μετά τον Καστοριάδη. Δρόμοι της Αυτονομίας στον 21ο Αιώνα. [After Castoriadis. Roads to Autonomy in the 21st Century]. Athens: Exarcheia, 2014. .

Schismenos, Alexandros. "Time in the ontology of Cornelius Castoriadis." SOCRATES. 5(3 and 4):64–81 (April 2018).
Alexandros Schismenos, Nikos Ioannou and Chris Spannos. Castoriadis and Autonomy in the Twenty First Century. London: Bloomsbury, 2021. .
Society of Friends of Cornelius Castoriadis. Ψυχή, Λόγος, Πόλις [Psyche, Logos, Polis]. Athens: Ypsilon, 2007. .
Yannis Stavrakakis. The Lacanian Left: Psychoanalysis, Theory, Politics. Edinburgh University Press, 2007, pp. 37–65. .
Yavor Tarinski. Short Introduction to the Political Legacy of Castoriadis. Athens: Aftoleksi, 2020.
Thesis Eleven, Special Issue 'Cornelius Castoriadis', 49(1), May 1997. London: Sage Publications. ISSN 0725-5136.
John B. Thompson. Studies in the Theory of Ideology. University of California Press, 1984, Chapter 1: "Ideology and the Social Imaginary. An Appraisal of Castoriadis and Lefort". .
Marcela Tovar-Restrepo, Castoriadis, Foucault, and Autonomy: New Approaches to Subjectivity, Society, and Social Change. Continuum International Publishing, 2012. .
Joel Whitebook. "Intersubjectivity and the Monadic Core of the Psyche: Habermas and Castoriadis on the Unconscious". In: Maurizio Passerin d'Entrèves and Seyla Benhabib (eds.), Habermas and the Unfinished Project of Modernity: Critical Essays on The Philosophical Discourse of Modernity. MIT Press, 1997, pp. 172–193. .

External links 

Overviews

Interviews
Videotaped interview with Chris Marker
 (with English subtitles)
 (The files and documents kept at the Inathèque de France can be consulted at the consultation centre at the Bibliothèque nationale de France.)

Obituaries; biographies
Cornelius Castoriadis 1922–1997 at the libertarian communist website libcom.org, 27 September 2003
David Ames Curtis. "Cornelius Castoriadis: An Obituary." Salmagundi, Spring–Summer 1998: 52–61. Reprinted as "Cornelius Castoriadis: Philosopher of the Social Imagination." Free Associations, 7:3 (1999): 321–30. Available online: <http://www.agorainternational.org/about.html>.
Symposium: Cornelius Castoriadis, 1922–1997, obituaries and profiles by Axel Honneth, Edgar Morin, and Joel Whitebook, Radical Philosophy magazine, July/August 1998 (access restricted to subscribers)
"Obituary: Castoriadis and the democratic tradition" by Takis Fotopoulos, Democracy & Nature, Vol. 4, No. 1 (1997)

Bibliographies; analyses; critiques
The Cornelius Castoriadis/Agora International Website contains bibliographies and videographies in many languages, a Castoriadis interview, a "Teaching Castoriadis" section, videos from the 1990 Castoriadis Colloqium at Cerisy (France), and the complete text of the Socialisme ou Barbarie magazine series (texts scanned in the original French), as well as "News" items of current and past interest
L'Association Castoriadis with bibliography, news, media events, original articles (in French)
"Castoriadis": entry by John V. Garner, Internet Encyclopedia of Philosophy
"Cornelius Castoriadis and the triumph of the will" by Alex Callinicos, Chapter 4.3 of  Trotskyism, 1990
Cornelius Castoriadis, critical analysis at the libertarian communist website libcom.org
"An Introduction to Cornelius Castoriadis' Work" by Fabio Ciaramelli, Journal of European Psychoanalysis #6, Winter 1998 (access restricted to subscribers)
"The Strange Afterlife of Cornelius Castoriadis" by Scott McLemee, Chronicle of Higher Education, 26 March 2004 (access restricted to subscribers) (reprint)
Full text of the Cornelius Castoriadis symposium held at the University of Akureyri, from the special issue of Nordicum-Mediterraneum, e-magazine of Nordic and Mediterranean studies, December 2008
Houston, Christopher, "Islam, Castoriadis and autonomy". Thesis Eleven, February 2004, 76(1), pp. 49–69
Suzi Adams, "Castoriadis' long journey through Nomos: Institution, creation, interpretation". Tijdschrift voor Filosofie, 70 (June), 269–295 (2008)
Linda M.G. Zerilli (2002), "Castoriadis, Arendt, and the Problem of the New", 
"The autonomy project and Inclusive Democracy: a critical review of Castoriadis' thought", by Takis Fotopoulos, The International Journal of Inclusive Democracy, Vol. 4, No. 2 (April 2008)
"Unities and Tensions in the Work of Cornelius Castoriadis With Some Considerations on the Question of Organization" by David Ames Curtis, talk delivered to "Autonomy or Barbarism"-sponsored event in Athens, 7 December 2007
Exchange of letters between Cornelius Castoriadis and Anton Pannekoek, originally published in Socialisme ou Barbarie, translated and introduced by Viewpoint Magazine

1922 births
1997 deaths
20th-century atheists
20th-century French economists
20th-century French philosophers
20th-century Greek philosophers
Anti-consumerists
Atheist philosophers
Continental philosophers
Critics of Marxism
Critics of religions
Degrowth advocates
Democracy activists
Former Marxists
French anti-capitalists
French male non-fiction writers
French political philosophers
French psychoanalysts
French Trotskyists
Emigrants from the Ottoman Empire to Greece
Greek emigrants to France
Greek anti-capitalists
Greek male writers
Greek philosophers
Greek political philosophers
Greek psychoanalysts
Greek Trotskyists
Historians of philosophy
Libertarian Marxists
Libertarian socialists
Marxist theorists
National and Kapodistrian University of Athens alumni
Philosophers of economics
Political philosophers
Academic staff of the School for Advanced Studies in the Social Sciences
Greek social commentators
French social commentators
Social constructionism
Social philosophers
Sustainability advocates
Theorists on Western civilization
Writers about activism and social change
Writers about globalization
Writers about religion and science
Writers from Athens